is a private high school in Purchase, Harrison, New York in the New York City metropolitan area. It is sponsored by Keio University, making it an overseas branch of a Japanese private school, or a Shiritsu zaigai kyōiku shisetsu (私立在外教育施設).

After the retirement of the Head of School, Ralph Townsend who served from August 2019, the executive director, Motohiro Tsuchiya (vice-president of Keio University) concurrently served. Later, Takayuki Tatsumi, Professor Emeritus of Keio University, was appointed as the Headmaster in January 2022.

History
The school was founded in 1990. Before Keio Academy opened, many children of Japanese nationals on work assignments in the United States returned to Japan to get a high school education. Keio Academy opened so they could get a Japanese education in the United States. By 1988 the Japanese government decided not to fund the school. When Keio Academy opened in 1990, the university fully funded the school.

In 1994 the school serves grades 9–12. It had 420 students that year, making it one of the largest Japanese curriculum schools located in the United States. In 1994 Yasumitsui Nihei, the principal, stated that of the 115 recent graduates, many began attending Keio University while only four went to American colleges.

Academics
In 1994 the school was accredited by the Ministry of Education of Japan and by the State of New York. That year, Nihei stated that the curriculum at the school would prepare a student for attending an American university.

Campus
The school has a  campus. The main school building, called the "Classroom Building," houses classrooms, administrative offices, the counseling room, the Japanese culture room, and the library. The culture room, where traditional Japanese activities are held, is on the first floor, and the library is located on the third floor. Matsushita Hall serves as the cafeteria. The school also has two dormitory facilities. The South Dorm houses the training room, the school's athletic center. The school also has the Health Center, which serves as a clinic.

As of 1994, 60-70% of Keio students board and live in dormitories.

Admissions and tuition
In 1994 the school did not admit children resident in Japan. That year Nihei stated that children resident in Japan may attend Japanese school campuses affiliated with Keio University. By 2019 the school began admitting Japan-resident pupils.

In 1994 there was a registration fee of $2,500 ($ with inflation) and a yearly tuition of $13,260 ($ with inflation).

Notable alumni
Keiji Ozaki, taekwondo practitioner
Jewels, former member of Heartsdales
Yuki Furukawa, actor and supermodel
YU, vocalist of I Don't Like Mondays.

See also

 Japanese in New York City
 American School in Japan, American international school in Tokyo

References

External links
 Keio Academy of New York
 Keio Academy of New York 

Private high schools in Westchester County, New York
Harrison, New York
Boarding schools in New York (state)
International schools in New York (state)
Japanese international schools in the United States
1990 establishments in New York (state)
Educational institutions established in 1990
Japanese-American culture in New York (state)
Keio University
Shiritsu zaigai kyōiku shisetsu